Yvon Lévesque (born March 10, 1940) is a politician in Quebec, Canada. He is the former Bloc Québécois Member of Parliament for the riding of Abitibi—Baie-James—Nunavik—Eeyou.

Born in Lac-au-Saumon, he was an electrician, foreman, labour relations consultant, labour representative, and superintendent before he was first elected in 2004 defeating Guy St-Julien by 572 votes.

On May 2, 2011, Lévesque was defeated in the 2011 federal election by New Democratic Party candidate Roméo Saganash.

References
 

1940 births
Living people
Bloc Québécois MPs
French Quebecers
Members of the House of Commons of Canada from Quebec
People from Bas-Saint-Laurent
People from Val-d'Or
21st-century Canadian politicians